San Simon or San Simón may refer to:

Places
San Simon, Arizona, an unincorporated community
San Simón, El Salvador, a municipality
San Simon, Pampanga, a municipality in the Philippines
San Simón, Táchira, a town in Táchira, Venezuela
San Simón Almolongas, a town and municipality in Oaxaca, Mexico
San Simón Zahuatlán, a town and municipality in Oaxaca, Mexico
Island of San Simón, Galicia, Spain
San Simon Valley, near the Dos Cabezas Mountains, U.S.A.
Mexico City Metrobús Line 1#San Simón

Other uses
San Simón de Moquegua, a football club from Moquegua, Peru
San Simón AKA Maximón, an object of folk belief in Guatemala, Mexico and elsewhere
San Simón cheese from Vilalba, Spain